Christopher Grimley (born 6 February 2000) is a Scottish badminton player who competes in international level events. His doubles partner is his twin brother Matthew Grimley. Christopher has competed at the 2018 Summer Youth Olympics.

Career

Early career 
Christopher Grimley started to know about badminton at the age of six because his parents playing this sport. He used to attend Lourdes Primary School before he got the chance to move to the Glasgow School of Sport, based at Bellahouston Academy. The twins have already won a host of titles and are the Scottish National U–13 doubles champions in 2012. They also hold the doubles titles for Glasgow, the West of Scotland and the East of Scotland. Christopher also won the Glasgow U–13 singles title.

2017–2018 
In 2017, Christopher and Matthew reached the round of 16 at the 2017 BWF World Junior Championships. The twins then won the silver medal at the 2018 European Junior Championships.

2019–2020 
In 2019, Christopher and Matthew were at least in the final four in six tournaments, and finished as runner-up at the Portugal International tournament.

In March 2020, the twins ranked as number 60 in BWF World ranking.

Achievements

European Junior Championships 
Boys' doubles

BWF International Challenge/Series (2 titles, 2 runners-up) 
Men's doubles

Mixed doubles

  BWF International Challenge tournament
  BWF International Series tournament
  BWF Future Series tournament

BWF Junior International (11 titles, 6 runners-up) 
Boys' singles

Boys' doubles

Mixed doubles

  BWF Junior International Grand Prix tournament
  BWF Junior International Challenge tournament
  BWF Junior International Series tournament
  BWF Junior Future Series tournament

References

External links 
 

2000 births
Living people
Sportspeople from Glasgow
Scottish male badminton players
Badminton players at the 2018 Summer Youth Olympics
Badminton players at the 2022 Commonwealth Games
Commonwealth Games competitors for Scotland
Twin sportspeople